John S. Barton (born 24 October 1953) is an English former professional footballer. He played professionally, as a full-back, for  Everton and Derby County before moving into non-league football and management.

Barton began his career with Stourbridge, moving to Worcester City in 1976. He helped Worcester to the Southern League First Division North title in 1976–77, and began to attract interest from a number of higher-level clubs. His final game for Worcester came in 1979 in their FA Cup win against Plymouth Argyle, Barton leaving the following week to join First Division Everton for a then record non-league fee of £25,000.

In 1983 Barton joined Derby County where he spent two years before joining Kidderminster Harriers, winning the FA Trophy in 1987. He later became assistant manager at Kidderminster with Graham Allner and worked in a similar role at Nuneaton Borough before becoming Nuneaton manager.

He was manager of Burton Albion from 1994 until September 1998 and was later manager of Worcester City for five years until resigning in January 2005.

In October 2007 Barton was appointed caretaker manager of Worcester City following the departure of Andy Preece.

References

External links
 

Living people
1953 births
Footballers from Birmingham, West Midlands
English footballers
Worcester City F.C. players
Everton F.C. players
Derby County F.C. players
Kidderminster Harriers F.C. players
English Football League players
Burton Albion F.C. managers
Worcester City F.C. managers
English football managers
Nuneaton Borough F.C. managers
Stourbridge F.C. players
Association football defenders